The 1999 Players Championship was a golf tournament in Florida on the PGA Tour, held  at TPC Sawgrass in Ponte Vedra Beach, southeast of Jacksonville. It was the 26th Players Championship. 

David Duval won his only Players Championship, two strokes head of runner-up Scott Gump. The victory moved him to number one in the Official World Golf Ranking, ahead of Tiger Woods, who finished six strokes back in a tie for tenth place.

Duval's father Bob, age 52, won the same day at the Emerald Coast Classic near Pensacola for his first victory on the Senior Tour. Both led entering the final round.

Duval's winning score of 285 (−3) remains the highest at the Stadium Course, the venue since 1982.

Defending champion Justin Leonard finished nine strokes back, in a tie for 23rd place.

Venue

Field
Fulton Allem, Billy Andrade, Stuart Appleby, Tommy Armour III, Paul Azinger, Seve Ballesteros, Doug Barron, Ben Bates, Jay Don Blake, Michael Bradley, Mark Brooks, Olin Browne, Tom Byrum, Mark Calcavecchia, Jim Carter, Brandel Chamblee, Barry Cheesman, Stewart Cink, Darren Clarke, Russ Cochran, John Cook, Fred Couples, Ben Crenshaw, John Daly, Robert Damron, Glen Day, Clark Dennis, Chris DiMarco, Trevor Dodds, Joe Durant, David Duval, Steve Elkington, Ernie Els, Bob Estes, Brad Fabel, Nick Faldo, Brad Faxon, Steve Flesch, Dan Forsman, Carlos Franco, Harrison Frazar, Bob Friend, David Frost, Fred Funk, Jim Furyk, Jeff Gallagher, Brent Geiberger, Bill Glasson, Paul Goydos, Wayne Grady, Scott Gump, Jay Haas, Dudley Hart, J. P. Hayes, Nolan Henke, Brian Henninger, Tim Herron, Gabriel Hjertstedt, Scott Hoch, Bradley Hughes, Mike Hulbert, John Huston, Peter Jacobsen, Lee Janzen, Miguel Ángel Jiménez, Brandt Jobe, Steve Jones, Jerry Kelly, Skip Kendall, Tom Kite, Greg Kraft, Neal Lancaster, Bernhard Langer, Franklin Langham, Tom Lehman, Justin Leonard, J. L. Lewis, Frank Lickliter, Bruce Lietzke, Davis Love III, Steve Lowery, Andrew Magee, Jeff Maggert, Doug Martin, Shigeki Maruyama, Len Mattiace, Billy Mayfair, Blaine McCallister, Scott McCarron, Rocco Mediate, Phil Mickelson, Larry Mize, Colin Montgomerie, Frank Nobilo, Greg Norman, Mark O'Meara, José María Olazábal, Naomichi Ozaki, Jesper Parnevik, Craig Parry, Steve Pate, Corey Pavin, Tom Pernice Jr., Chris Perry, Kenny Perry, Lee Porter, Nick Price, Tom Purtzer, Mike Reid, Larry Rinker, Lee Rinker, Loren Roberts, Scott Simpson, Joey Sindelar, Vijay Singh, Jeff Sluman, Mike Springer, Craig Stadler, Paul Stankowski, Payne Stewart, Curtis Strange, Steve Stricker, David Sutherland, Kevin Sutherland, Hal Sutton, Phil Tataurangi, Esteban Toledo, Tommy Tolles, David Toms, Kirk Triplett, Ted Tryba, Bob Tway, Omar Uresti, Scott Verplank, Grant Waite, Duffy Waldorf, Tom Watson, Brian Watts, Kevin Wentworth, Lee Westwood, Mark Wiebe, Willie Wood, Tiger Woods, Ian Woosnam, Fuzzy Zoeller

Round summaries

First round
Thursday, March 25, 1999

Second round
Friday, March 26, 1999

Source:

Third round
Saturday, March 27, 1999

Source:

Final round
Sunday, March 28, 1999

References

External links
The Players Championship website

1999
1999 in golf
1999 in American sports
1999 in sports in Florida
March 1999 sports events in the United States